Jack Hollington (born 2 July 2001) is a British actor who has appeared in film, radio, stage and television productions. He made his debut in the National Theatre's production of An Inspector Calls followed by a role in the touring production of Medea. Hollington's breakthrough performance was as Nathan in the West End and National Tour play of The Full Monty. His television roles began with the Doctor Who episode, The Time of the Doctor, followed by the Casualty episode Home.

Career
In 2015, Hollington played the lead role of young Leo Colston in the BBC television production of The Go-Between alongside Jim Broadbent and Vanessa Redgrave. His performance in The Go- Between was considered by Jasper Rees in The Daily Telegraph to be: " a superbly intuitive performance from a young actor bearing a heavy burden. Hollington held his ground throughout"..."In key scenes he sang like Ernest Lough and took his cricket catch like Ben Stokes." Sam Woolaston, for The Guardian, praised Hollington's performance: "not just for his convincing performance as young Leo, but also for being a totally convincing young Jim Broadbent (old Leo)".  The Go-Between was nominated for a BAFTA award in the category of best single drama in 2016.

Hollington has the role of 'Young Beowulf' in three episodes of the ITV television mini-series Beowulf: The Return to the Shield Lands and has roles in feature films Bitter Harvest and Brimstone .

Filmography

Film

Television

Theatre

References

2001 births
Living people
21st-century British male actors
British male film actors
British male radio actors
British male stage actors
British male television actors